Krishna Pal Singh Rajpoot is an Indian politician from Uttar Pradesh who served as Member of 16th Uttar Pradesh Assembly from Babina Assembly constituency.

Personal life 
He was born on 9 January 1970 to Balak Das Rajpoot in Pulgahna, Jhansi district. He has completed up to intermediate education. He married Lali Devi Rajput on 2 July 1988 and has two sons.

Career 
In 2012 Uttar Pradesh Legislative Assembly election, he defeated Chandrapal Singh Yadav with 68,144 votes and the margin of 6,955 votes. In 2017 Uttar Pradesh Legislative Assembly election, he lost the election and ended at third position with 42,614 votes.

References 

1970 births
Living people